Rosario + Vampire is a Japanese anime series based on the manga series of the same title written and illustrated by Akihisa Ikeda. The story revolves around Tsukune Aono, a boy with poor grades who accidentally enrolls into Yokai Academy, a special school inhabited by monsters, and demons where humans are not allowed. There he encounters the vampire Moka Akashiya who is attracted to his blood's sweet taste. While trying to hide his human identity, he meets other girls who take a romantic interest in him. The anime is loosely based on the first nineteen chapters of the manga and focuses more on the romantic comedy aspect and the "monster of the week" motif that was previously featured in tokusatsu shows, as well as some rare occasions of breaking the fourth wall. The second season is loosely based on the Rosario + Vampire: Season II manga, focusing on Tsukune and the girls' second year at Yokai Academy and introducing characters from the second serialization as well as new anime-only characters, as with the first season. The series became notorious for its excessive use of fanservice, mainly in the form of panty shots, which resulted in the second season being censored on two networks, as well as angering many fans of the original manga.

Two seasons, consisting of thirteen episodes each, were produced by Gonzo under the directorship of Takayuki Inagaki. The first season, Rosario + Vampire, originally aired on Tokyo MX, Chiba TV, and TV Kanagawa  between January 3 and March 27, 2008. Six DVD compilation volumes were released between April 25 and September 26, 2008, and a DVD/Blu-ray box set was released on January 29, 2010. The second season, Rosario + Vampire Capu2, aired 13 episodes on TV Osaka from October 1 to December 24, 2008, with several other stations starting from October 2 to December 30, 2008. Six DVD volumes were released between December 21, 2008 and May 22, 2009, and a DVD/Blu-ray box set was released on March 19, 2010. The anime is licensed in North America by Funimation Entertainment, and it released both seasons on December 20, 2011. The anime is also licensed in Australia and New Zealand by Madman Entertainment, who've released both seasons in 2012.

Four pieces of theme music were used for the series. The opening theme for the first season is "Cosmic Love", while the ending theme is called "Dancing in the Velvet Moon". The opening theme for the second season is "DISCOTHEQUE" while the ending theme is "Trinity Cross". The four pieces are performed by Nana Mizuki.

Series overview

Episode list

Rosario + Vampire (2008)

Rosario + Vampire: Capu2 (2008)

References

External links
Official anime website (archived) 
Rosario + Vampire – The Official Anime Website from FUNimation (archived)

Rosario + Vampire
Episodes